Fingest is a village in Buckinghamshire, England.  

It is in the Chiltern Hills near the border with Oxfordshire. It is about six miles WSW of High Wycombe.  It lies in the civil parish of Hambleden.

The parish church of St Bartholomew's dates from the early Norman period.  It has an unusual tower, with a double vaulted roof.  The church is a Grade I listed building.

Name

Name history

 Tinghurst, Tynhurst (11-13th cent.) 
 Tyngehurst (14th cent.) 
 Tingerst alias Fyngerst or Fingest (16-18th cent.)

Toponym

  The wood or wooded hill where the assembly meet   

Fingest : ( Ting..hurst , Tyn..hurst  ) 11-13th cent. 

The name is a hybrid of Old Norse and Old English.

The first element  ' ting ' or ' tyn '  is from Old Norse Þing - (  ' thing'  )  (  ” assembly place ”  ).

The next element  ” hurst ”  is from Old English  ” hyrst ”  (  ” wood or wooded hill ”  ).

History

The ancient parish of Fingest included Cadmore End to the north of the village, which became a separate ecclesiastical parish in 1852.

The manor of Fingest anciently belonged to St Albans Abbey. In 1163 it was given to the bishop of Lincoln. The ghost of Henry Burghersh, 14th-century Bishop of Lincoln, is reputed to haunt the area. After this time it was used as the country residence for the Lincoln diocese until 1547 when it was seized by the Crown.  It was then given two years later to the Duke of Somerset who exchanged it with a property belonging to Wells Cathedral. The manor is now privately owned.

The civil parish of Fingest, originally based on the ecclesiastical parish, was enlarged in 1934 by adding land from the parishes of West Wycombe, Great Marlow and Hambleden.  As a result, Lane End became the largest settlement in the parish, and the parish was renamed Fingest and Lane End in 1937. In the 1980s the civil parish was abolished.  The larger part became the parish of Lane End, and the village of Fingest was added to Hambleden parish.

Scenes of the period drama The Monuments Men were shot in Fingest in May 2013.

Notes

Citations

Sources

Online

Books

External links

Villages in Buckinghamshire
Former civil parishes in Buckinghamshire
Hambleden